Antoine Basler is a Swiss actor. He has appeared in more than sixty films since 1983.

Selected filmography

References

External links
 

Living people
People from Lausanne
Swiss male film actors
Swiss male television actors
20th-century Swiss male actors
21st-century Swiss male actors
Year of birth missing (living people)